Ziyu (Chinese: 子舆; pinyin: Hán Zǐyú), ancestral name Jì (姬), clan name Hán (韩), personal name Yú (舆), and posthumously known as Ziyu of Han, was the fourth head of the House of Han. He was the son of Dingbo of Han. Ziyu was succeeded by his son Xianzi of Han.

Ancestors

References

Zhou dynasty nobility
Monarchs of Han (state)